Alan Titherley was an English badminton player. Born in 1903 he started to play badminton in the early 1920s and was soon selected by Cheshire. He was capped by England in the 1931/2 season and made 19 international appearances, the last in 1946/7. He competed in the All England Championships reaching three finals. He later won the All England Veterans doubles three times retiring unbeaten from the event in 1954. He died on 24 June 1963 at his home in Wallasey.

Medal Record at the All England Badminton Championships

References

English male badminton players
1903 births
1963 deaths